Verbesina occidentalis is a flowering plant in the family Asteraceae. The common names for Verbesina occidentalis are yellow crownbeard and stick weed. Verbesina occidentalis is often considered a weedy plant of disturbed areas, due its presence in managed agricultural areas such as hayfields.

Description 
The average height for Verbisina occidentalis is a yard tall. The plant has potential to grow to 2 yards in height. Verbisina occidentalis has yellow disk flowers. The number of ray flowers will range anywhere from two to five petals. The most common petal number is two. The flowers are sparse and are not evenly arranged around the head of the flower. This makes the plant looks like it is uneven or off balance. A distinctive feature of the plant is its winged stem. The plant is a perennial and will bloom during the late summer. The leaves are opposite in arrangement. The leaves are broad and ovate in shape. The leaves are typically 2 1/3 to 4 3/4 inches in length. The width of the leaves are usually eight to 3 to 6 1/3 inches wide. The leaves are glabrous which gives it a smooth surface. The leaves will start to taper towards the apex. Verbesina occidentalis leaves have a serrated or toothed margin.

Distribution and habitat 
Verbesina occidentalis prefers sunny habits. Verbesina occidentalis can live in partially sunny habitats but, it will not grow as well. The plant requires moderate amounts of moisture. Verbesina occidentalis needs the soil to be at least moderately nutrient. Verbesina occidentalis frequently occurs in pastures and hayfields. It can also be found at roadsides, fencerows, parking lots, creek sides and forested areas. Verbesina occidentalis is native to the United States. It is native to every southeastern state except for Arkansas. The range of the plant extends as far west as Texas and as far east as Delaware. The most northern state that Verbesina occidentalis is found in is Pennsylvania. The most southern state that Verbesina occidentalis is found in is Florida.

Taxonomy 
The genus most closely related to Verbesina is Sphagneticola. Together, Verbisina and Sphagneticola form a clade. The next most closely genera are Calyptocarpus and Eclipta.Verbesina alternifolia is the sister species.

Gardening 
Verbesina occidentalis can be used in the home garden for insect control. Verbesina occidentalis attracts the soldier beetle. The soldier beetle is attracted to the plant for two reasons. It is believed that the soldier beetle is attracted to Verbesina occidentalis due to its coloration. The soldier beetle is also yellow and can hide among the flowers. The soldier beetle will also drink the nectar from the plant. When the soldier beetle drinks the nectar it does not harm the plant.  Both the adult and larva of the soldier beetle will prey on other insects. The adult soldier beetles will eat the aphids, caterpillars, grasshopper eggs and mites. The larva of the soldier beetle hatches in the spring. The larva soldier beetles prey upon insect eggs, larva, snails, and slugs. The soldier beetle lays its eggs in the late summer.

Ecology 
Verbesina occidentalis has been shown to be one of the plants that is sensitive to the rising ozone levels. Due to the rising of ozone levels Verbesina occidentalis has been shown to have foliar ozone injury. Foliar ozone injury results in visible damage to the plant. Foliar ozone injury tends to be worse in more sun exposed leaves. In the Smokey Mountain National Park approximately fifty percent of the plants sampled showed symptoms of foliar ozone injury. Approximately seventeen percent of the leaves sampled were injured. The percent of plants injured increases as the elevation increases. The stippling may become more prominent in late summer. It may begin as a few stipples that are angular in shape. The coloring of the stippling may range from a light reddish-purple to black. In prolonged cases the leaves will become yellow color and may eventually die.

Verbesina occidentalis has been shown to effect the diversity of the plant community and the density of the other plants present. With the removal of Verbesina occidentalis the evenness and the Shannon diversity has been shown to increase. Shannon diversity index is a measurement of the diversity of the community. Forbs and woody plants are some the plants that are more sensitive to Verbesina occidentalis. N-fixers and grasses are also sensitive to Verbesina occidentalis.

Control 
Verbesina occidentalis is considered problematic for farmers. The legume and hay field farmers seem to be some of the most negatively affected by Verbesina occidentalis due to competition. In some severe cases farmers will see a reduction in crop yields. In the past natural forms of control has been used. The use of goats for control of Verbesina occidentalis is unsuccessful since the goats will not consume the plant. The most successful form of control are herbicides. Verbesina occidentalis can be controlled at a ninety three percent rate with two pints per acre of Grazon P+D herbicide. Redeem R&P herbicide was not as potent to Verbesina occidentalis. It took at least three pints of Redeem R&P to achieve the ninety three percent control rate. Crossbow 2,4-D alone would control Verbesina occidentalis up to a rate of eighty three percent. However, when Benvel herbicide is used alone the control rate for Verbesina occidentalis is less than fifty percent. There are many other herbicides that have used to control Verbesina occidentalis but, none had a profound impact.

References 

occidentalis